Zdrojek may refer to the following places:
Zdrojek, Działdowo County in Warmian-Masurian Voivodeship (north Poland)
Zdrojek, Nidzica County in Warmian-Masurian Voivodeship (north Poland)
Zdrojek, Olsztyn County in Warmian-Masurian Voivodeship (north Poland)